This is a list of Brazilian television related events from 2005.

Events
29 March - Jean Wyllys wins the fifth season of Big Brother Brasil.
18 December - Actress Karina Bacchi and her partner Fabiano Vivas win the first season of Dança dos Famosos.

Debuts
20 November - Dança dos Famosos (2005–present)
No date - MTVLab (2005-2011)

Television shows

1970s
Turma da Mônica (1976–present)

1990s
Malhação (1995–present)
Cocoricó (1996–present)

2000s
Sítio do Picapau Amarelo (2001–2007)
Big Brother Brasil (2002–present)

Ending this year
FAMA (2002-2005)

Births

Deaths

See also
2005 in Brazil
List of Brazilian films of 2005